The Southeast Iowa Superconference, also known as the SEISC, is a 18-team athletics and activities conference based in southeastern Iowa. The conference was created in 1991 from the merger of the Deerwood Conference and the Southeast Iowa Conference. It is made up of 1A, 2A and 3A high schools.

History
The conference formed from the 20 schools in the Deerwood Conference (Danville, Harmony, New London, Notre Dame, Burlington, Van Buren, WACO, West Burlington, and Winfield-Mt. Union), the Southeast Iowa Conference (Cardinal, Central Lee, Columbus Community, Highland, Lone Tree, Louisa–Muscatine, Mediapolis, Pekin, and Wapello), plus Aquinas, Cardinal Stritch, and Marquette Catholic to provide an upgrade in football schedules and to provide competition for non-athletic events such as speech, music, and art. 

Since the conference's founding, there have been many changes. For one, the Iowa High School Athletic Association took complete control of the football scheduling by implementing the current district format. Also, many of the schools have since stopped participating in the fine arts portion of the conference, which has led to debate as to whether the conference in its current state even makes sense. Since the conference's founding, three schools have closed (Ft. Madison Aquinas and Marquette of West Point in 2005, and Cardinal Stritch in Keokuk in 2006.) The conference added Maharishi and Iowa Mennonite in 1996–97 and Ft. Madison Holy Trinity joined the league in 2005 as Aquinas's successor. Harmony High School consolidated with Van Buren schools in 2016.

For the 2019–20 school year, the Iowa Mennonite School changed their name to Hillcrest Academy, and adopted "Ravens" as their mascot.

At the start of the 2022-2023 school year, the Cardinal Comets departed the SEISC for the South Central Conference.

Members

North

South

References

External links
 Official site

High school sports in Iowa
1992 establishments in Iowa
Sports leagues established in 1992